The Chijon Family (or Jijon Family) was a South Korean gang of 6 members. The gang was founded in 1993 by Kim Gi-hwan, a former convict, and six other former prisoners and unemployed workers who shared his grudge against the rich. 'Chijon' is a name given to the gang by prosecutors working on the Kim had originally named his gang the Mascan, apparently believing the word to be of Greek origin and to signify 'ambition', though no Greek word of similar meaning and pronunciation can be identified.

Gang

Members
Kim Gi-hwan (김기환) - Kim Gi-hwan was the leader of the gang. He was 26 years old (all ages here are in Korean age). It was said that he was the top student in his class. He ranked amateur dan 1 in baduk ('go (game)' in Japanese). According to his report card, he skipped many days of school due to his family's financial problems. He left school during middle school grade 1 (age 13) because of this. Later on, he moved to Busan and worked in a shoe factory or a plywood factory, then moved to Seoul to do manual labor. He began to think of committing heinous acts after watching the news about corruption in the university entrance exams. Kim was the first of the gang members to be arrested and convicted for raping his ex-friend's niece, and was sentenced to five years. The police at that time had not known that Kim already killed the gang's first victim.

Moon Sang-rok (문상록) - He was 23 at the time. Prior to the gang, he already had 3 convictions.

Kim Hyun-yang (김현양) - He was 22 at the time.

Kang Dong-un (강동운) - He was 21 at the time. Prior to the gang, he already had 2 previous convictions of special larceny.

Baek Byung-ok (백병옥) - He was 20 at the time. Prior to the gang, he had already committed 2 special robberies.

Kang Moon-sub (강문섭) - He was 20 at the time.

Song Bung-un (송붕운) - He was 18 at the time.

Lee Kyung-sook (이경숙) - She was 23 at the time. She joined the gang later than the other members. Prior to joining, she met one of the gang members, Kang Dong-un, at a coffee house. After they started dating, Kang paid all of Lee's debts.

All of the male members worked in construction zones or factories prior to the gang.

Formation 
During the summer of 1993, Kim Gi-hwan met Moon Sang-rok and Kim Hyun-yang at a poker game. Kim Gi-hwan started to expressed hatred against wealthy people, in which the other two agreed. That evening, they decided to form that gang and established a doctrine. Over the next few weeks, they went to workers at construction sites and persuaded them to join. They managed to convinced Kang Dong-un and Baek Byung-ok, as they were both convicted robbers, plus Kang Moon-sub and Song Bong-un.

Kim Gi-hwan asked all seven members to gather all their finances. They used it to fund two vehicles, walkie-talkies, dynamite, 17 weapons including 6 rifles, a submachine gun, a pistol, an air gun, a military sword, a hiking knife, and an electric prod. They also supplied a small incineration facility, and added three prison cells to its basement. Their plan was to gather a billion won (about $1,250,000 in 1993) through kidnapping and extortion on the rich.

Part of their own training was hiking and camping Jirisan, the second tallest mountain in South Korea. The more experienced members would give detailed lessons on dynamite handling and kidnapping.

Doctrine 
Their doctrine was as follows:

1. 우리는 돈 많은 자들을 저주한다.
  We hate the rich.
2. 조직을 배신한 자는 반드시 죽인다.
  A traitor to the group must be killed.
3. 여자는 어머니도 믿지 말라.
  Do not trust women, not even your mother.

Victims
Kim Gi-hwan's friend's niece - She was raped by Kim Gi-hwan, the gang leader on June 17 (before the gang's first murder). This resulted in Kim's early arrest after the second murder.

Miss Choi - She was 20 at the time. On July 18, 1993, the gang abducted her under a train bridge, took her to a remote hill, and gang raped her. They considered this as "practice," the victim was not wealthy and was a farmer's daughter. According to a confession by Kim Hyun-yang, Kim Gi-hwan choked the victim and said, "this is how you kill a person." She was murdered on July 18, 1993, at about 11:00p.m. Her body was discovered by a villager who was cutting weed. The police did not find the motive nor who the murderers were until the gang made their confessions much later.

Song Bong-un - He was actually a member of the gang. He was 18 at the time. He managed the gang's treasurer who managed the funds, and escaped with 3 million won of the gang's money. The remaining gang members found him hiding at his relative's house in Siheung (시흥) in August 1993. They took him to a secluded area about 4 km away from their incineration facility, and proceeded to kill him by shooting him in the head. They also killed and ate a dog at the same location afterwards. During their arrest, they helped the police find Song's buried body.

Lee Jeong-su and boyfriend - The woman (27) was a café worker. The man (34) was a musician. The couple had been casually dating. On September 8, 1994, at about 3:00am, the gang was wandering around the motels in Yangsu-ri (양수리), as they heard a rumor that those were "popular" destinations of the rich. Although neither were wealthy, the musician was driving a Hyundai Grandeur, which was considered as a sign of wealth at the time. This made the couple the gang's next targets and they started to tailed them down. They trapped the boyfriend's Grandeur with their pickup truck behind and their Daewoo LeMans in front. They fired with a gas gun, stabbed the musician and began to beat them up. The Grandeur car alarm went off, but there was no one was around. They tied the couple with tape, took them to their incineration facility, and locked them behind the bars. A member brought her milk and bread, but Lee Jeong-su did not take it. He said to her, "You have to have known real hunger to know how precious each drop of milk is." It turned out that the gang mistook them to be wealthy.

The next night, the gang demanded an amount of money that the musician did not have. After confirmation that the musician was not wealthy, the gang told him that they would kill him "painlessly." They forced Lee Jeong-su to help in order to have her be part of the murder, and to prevent her from escaping and reporting to the police. They forced him to drink liquor, and then she placed a plastic wrap over his head and suffocated him.  Kim Hyun-yang convinced the gang to let Lee Jeong-su live. The gang then took the body of the musician to a cliff, placed him in the driver's seat of his car, and then pushed the car off the cliff. Prior to this, one of the gang members purposefully left the Grandeur's skid marks near the cliff. They also gang raped Lee Jeong-su at the same location. The musician's relatives reported the disappearance to the police. The next day, a construction worker discovered the car and the musician. The police considered it an accident. From the smell of alcohol from the body's mouth, the assumption was made that it was a case of drunk driving.

Mr. So and Mrs. Park - Although the husband, So (42), owned a factory in Ulsan, the couple lived in Seoul. It was said that So bought the factory not long before the incident. On September 13, 1994, right before the Chuseok holiday, he and his wife, Park, were picking weed off the grave of his family member. It was here that the gang abducted them and took them to the incineration facility. They demanded So 100 million won cash. He told them that although he did not have that amount of money, he said that he could give them 80 million. This 80 million was originally for the factory workers and the maintenance of the factory. Keeping So's wife as a hostage, they sent So to get the money. So got his worker to get the money to him. Although the worker reported to the police in Ulsan, the worker was told to report to Gwangju where the money was given to So. Police departments leaving the case to another jurisdiction happened many times in South Korea back then. In Gwangju, the police assumed that this was a fake case to hide from the company's financial problems. Despite giving the gang the money, the gang forced Lee Jeong-su to shoot both So and Park's head with the air gun. They ate parts of the bodies, even forcing Lee Jeong-su to eat the liver. To hide the smell from the incineration, the gang had a barbecue in front of the facility. They even offered the pork barbecue to the villagers. One gang member later admitted to dismembering his victims and eating their flesh, saying this was to fire up his courage and to renounce his humanity.

Rich list 
The gang, emboldened by a series of successful murders and kidnappings, decided that they needed a more effective way to pick out wealthy victims. They were able to buy the mailing list from Seoul's exclusive Hyundai Department Store from a disgruntled worker. The list contained the names of the shop's 1,200 best customers who paid with credit cards. From this list, they chose their next victims. The department store worker was arrested after the gang got arrested.

Lee Jeong-su's Escape 
On September 16, 1994, the gang practiced throwing dynamite, planning to free Kim Gi-hyang from prison. Both Kim Hyun-yang and Lee Jeong-su got burnt during a practice, and went to the hospital. Kim trusted her, and left her responsible for 500 thousand won cash and Kang Dong-un's cell phone. At the waiting room, Kim told her, "Do you want to run away? Do you want to escape? If you want to run away, run away." She couldn't tell if he was testing her or not. The gang had told her before that there were thousands of members in the Chijon family, and they could capture her no matter where she escaped.

The nurse called Kim in to the room. It was during this time that the Lee Jeong-su found a chance to escape. She took a taxi, then called for a rental car while hiding at a vineyard. The rental car drove her to Daejeon where she then took a taxi to Seoul. She was too scared to report to the police. Instead, she hid in a motel in Yeoksam-dong, Seoul. From there, she called a male friend to report to the police for her. He reported to the Seocho Police Station. Later on, she went to the police station.

At first, the police did not believe her. They thought she was high on drugs and checked her for any hypodermic needle marks, not finding any. The chief criminal investigator (Go Byung-cheon) realized that Lee Jeong-su was talking about the missing married couple, who had not yet been mentioned on the news. The police began to believe her and initiated an investigation.

Arrest & conviction 
The gang had been watching the local police department. When they saw that there was no action to search for them, the gang assumed that Lee Jeong-su did not report them.

The police traced So's cell phone. They found it to be in Yeonggwang County. It matched Lee Jeong-su's story.

In the early morning of September 17, 1994, the police went to Jangsu where the musician's car was pushed down. Although the local police were aware of the car, the ones in the Seocho District were not aware. After confirming the case's truth, the police waited at the apartment where gang member Kang Dong-un lived. They arrested him on September 19 when he arrived in the pickup truck. The police called the rest of the gang, claiming to be at the hospital, and said that Kang was in a big accident. After luring them, the police arrested them.

After the gang got arrested, the broker who got them the weapons, especially the illegal firearms, was arrested. It is currently nearly impossible for a civilian to order a firearm in South Korea now.

Death sentences
On November 1, 1994, the Chijon family (except for Kang Dong-un's girlfriend, Lee Kyung-sook, who did not take part in any of the murders) was sentenced to death for the murder of five people. After sentencing, none of the murderers showed any trace of remorse. Kim Hyun-yang told television reporters before his trial that his only regret was that he had not killed more rich kids.

On November 2, 1995, all members of the Chijon family (except for Lee Kyung-sook) were executed at Seoul Detention Center. Lee Kyung-sook was just convicted of fleeing the scene of (a) crime(s).

Copy cat crimes
During their arrest and a press conference, one of the gang members claimed that there were more of them out there.

Due to the lack of information provided to the public at the time, it was widely assumed that all of the victims were wealthy people.

At the same time of the 1996 North Korean commandos infiltration incident, there was a South Korean 9-man copycat gang of the Chijon Family. The copycat gang called themselves the Maggapa (막가파). The police arrested them on October 29, 1996.

References

Executed South Korean serial killers
Male serial killers
People convicted of murder by South Korea
People executed by South Korea by hanging
South Korean cannibals